Traiguén Formation is a volcano-sedimentary formation of Miocene age, located in the archipelagoes of Aysén Region of western Patagonia.

Geology 
The volcanic and sedimentary rocks were deposited in a marine environment. Neither the base nor the top of the formation is known. Copious dykes of basic composition and aphanitic texture intrude the formation.

At some locations Miocene plutons of the North Patagonian Batholith intrude the Traiguén Formation. The intruded plutons are of varied composition including gabbro and granodiorite.

See also

References 

Geologic formations of Chile
Miocene Series of South America
Neogene Chile
Tuff formations
Geology of Aysén Region